"Exodus '04" is the 3rd English single (18th overall) by Utada and written by themself and Timbaland.
It was released on June 21, 2005. It hit #24 on the Billboard Hot Dance/Club Airplay chart. Similarly to that of "Devil Inside," no music video was produced.

"Exodus '04 (JJ Flores Double J Radio Mix)"was featured on Utada's first English compilation album, Utada the Best.

Track listing

(*) This version is the same that appears on the CD format as Double J Extended Mix.

Charts

Weekly charts

References

External links
UTADA Official Website — Official Island Records UTADA site 
UTADA Official Website — Official Island Records UTADA site 

2005 singles
Song recordings produced by Timbaland
Hikaru Utada songs
Songs written by Timbaland
Songs written by Hikaru Utada
2005 songs